Gregorio Aldama (born 12 March 1938) is a Cuban boxer. He competed in the men's light heavyweight event at the 1968 Summer Olympics.

References

1938 births
Living people
Light-heavyweight boxers
Cuban male boxers
Olympic boxers of Cuba
Boxers at the 1968 Summer Olympics
Sportspeople from Matanzas